State Road 247 (NM 247) is a  state highway in the US state of New Mexico. NM 247's western terminus is at U.S. Route 54 (US 54) in Corona, and the eastern terminus is at US 285 south-southeast of Ramon.

History

NM 247 was created in the 1988 renumbering when NM 42 was shortened. Before 1988 it was the easternmost segment of NM 42.

Major intersections

See also

References

247
Transportation in Lincoln County, New Mexico
Transportation in De Baca County, New Mexico